Carex caryophyllea is a species of plant in the family Cyperaceae first described by Marc Antoine Louis Claret de La Tourrette. Two varieties are listed in the World Checklist of Selected Plant Families:
 Carex caryophyllea var. caryophyllea — temperate regions of the Old World
 Carex caryophyllea var. microtricha  — Far East, Korea, North and Central Japan

References

 E. Foerster: Seggen, Binsen, Simsen und andere Scheingräser des Grünlandes – Ein Schlüssel zum Bestimmen im blütenlosen Zustand. Manuskript, Kleve-Kellen März 1982.

caryophyllea